Karantina Island (literally "Quarantine Island") is an island in the Gulf of İzmir, Turkey.

The ancient history of the island is related to that of the ancient site Klazomenai. During the 19th century the island was equipped with the up to date medical instruments and it was used as a quarantine island. In 1950, the buildings were restored to be used as a hospital. In 1955, its name was "Sun and Sea Treatment Institute". After the construction of new buildings it was renamed as "Urla Hospital of Orthopedics". In 1986, the hospital was redesigned as a general purpose hospital.

It is planned to open a medical museum on the island.

References

Islands of Turkey
Islands of İzmir Province
Urla District
Aegean islands
Gulf of İzmir